That's a Good Girl is a 1933 British comedy film directed by Jack Buchanan and starring Buchanan, Elsie Randolph and Dorothy Hyson. The film was based on a musical show of the same title that opened at the Lewisham Hippodrome on 19 March 1928, in which Jack Buchanan also starred. The music was written by Joseph Meyer and Phil Charig, with lyrics by Douglas Furber. The film omitted much of music of the original show, but popularised one song in particular, Fancy our Meeting. The song remained a Jack Buchanan favourite and a version of it was also recorded by Al Bowlly shortly after the film's release.

The film was made at British and Dominion Elstree Studios, and its sets were designed by the art director Lawrence P. Williams.

Cast
 Jack Buchanan as Jack Barrow  
 Elsie Randolph as Joy Dean  
 Dorothy Hyson as Moya Malone 
 Garry Marsh as Francis Moray 
 Vera Pearce as Suny Berata  
 William Kendall as Timothy  
 Kate Cutler as Helen Malone  
 Frank Stanmore as Malone  
 Anthony Holles as Canzone

References

Bibliography
 Low, Rachael. Filmmaking in 1930s Britain. George Allen & Unwin, 1985.
 Wood, Linda. British Films, 1927-1939. British Film Institute, 1986.

External links

1933 films
British comedy films
1933 comedy films
British and Dominions Studios films
Films shot at Imperial Studios, Elstree
British black-and-white films
1930s English-language films
1930s British films